Antoine Valois-Fortier (born 13 March 1990) is a Canadian retired judoka who won the bronze medal in the −81 kg category at the 2012 Olympics, becoming the first Canadian to win a medal in Olympic judo in twelve years and the fifth to win one in Canadian history.

Career
Valois-Fortier entered the 2012 Olympics ranked 21st in the world in his weight class. He pulled off several upset victories, including a win over Olympic gold medalist Elnur Mammadli, to make the quarterfinals. He lost to Ivan Nifontov of Russia, but made the repechage and defeated Emmanuel Lucenti of Argentina to enter the bronze medal match against Travis Stevens, which he then won. Valois-Fortier's win is Canada's first Olympic medal in Judo since 2000, which was a silver won by his coach Nicolas Gill, and only the fifth won by a Canadian in Olympic history.

At the 2016 Olympics he won his first two bouts, but then lost the third bout to the eventual gold medalist Khasan Khalmurzaev and the repechage match to a bronze medalist Takanori Nagase.

In June 2021, Valois-Fortier was named to Canada's 2020 Olympic team. In December 2021, Valois-Fortier announced his retirement from competitive judo. Valos-Forter will remain a part of the national team, as a coach.

Honours
In 2012 Valois-Fortier was awarded the Queen Elizabeth II Diamond Jubilee Medal.

See also
 Judo in Quebec
 Judo in Canada
 List of Canadian judoka

References

External links

 
 
 
 
 
 Interview with Valois-Fortier about his cross-Canada tour (CBC Radio)
 2012 Olympic −81 kg bronze medal match: Antoine Valois-Fortier vs. Travis Stevens (CTV Olympics on YouTube); Alternate video (IOC on YouTube)

1990 births
Living people
Canadian male judoka
Olympic judoka of Canada
Judoka at the 2012 Summer Olympics
Medalists at the 2012 Summer Olympics
Olympic bronze medalists for Canada
Olympic medalists in judo
Sportspeople from Quebec City
Pan American Games bronze medalists for Canada
Judoka at the 2016 Summer Olympics
Pan American Games medalists in judo
Judoka at the 2011 Pan American Games
Medalists at the 2011 Pan American Games
Judoka at the 2020 Summer Olympics